Inked may refer to:
 Inked (video game)
 Inked (magazine)

See also
Ink (disambiguation)